James Bosman is a New Hampshire politician.

Education
Bosman earned a B.A. from Hope College and a M.E.d. from Bridgewater State University.

Career
On November 6, 2018, Bosman was elected to the New Hampshire House of Representatives where he represents the Hillsborough 38 district. Bosman assumed office on December 5, 2018. Bosman is a Democrat.

Personal life
Bosman resides in Francestown, New Hampshire. Bosman is married.

References

Living people
Bridgewater State University alumni
Hope College alumni
People from Francestown, New Hampshire
Democratic Party members of the New Hampshire House of Representatives
21st-century American politicians
Year of birth missing (living people)